This is the list of episodes for The Late Late Show with Craig Ferguson in 2008.

2008

January

February

March

April

May

June

July

August

September

October

November

December

References

External links
 Craig Ferguson on Twitter
 The Late Late Show with Craig Ferguson at CBS
 The Late Late Show with Craig Ferguson on Twitter
 The Late Late Show with Craig Ferguson on Facebook